The electoral district of Kew is an electoral district of the Victorian Legislative Assembly. Located in eastern Melbourne, a few kilometres from the city centre, it is centred on the suburbs of Kew and Kew East. It also contains Balwyn, Balwyn North, Deepdene, and parts of Canterbury, Mont Albert, and Surrey Hills.

The current member for Kew is Jess Wilson.

Geography 
The boundaries of the Victorian electoral districts and regions, including Kew, are determined by the independent and impartial Electoral Boundaries Commission. Redivisions typically occur when there have been two state elections since the last redivision.

As of the 2022 Victorian state election, Kew follows the Yarra River along the north and west, follows Winfield Rd, Evelina St, Kerry Pde, Barloa Rd, and York St on the east, and follows Mont Albert Rd and Barkers Rd with the boundary extending down into Canterbury Rd between Balwyn Rd and Burke Rd on the south.

In the boundary redistribution for the 2022 Victorian state election, Kew gained 6,514 voters from the Box Hill district.

The seat is located almost entirely within the federal seat of Kooyong.

Demography 
As per the 2021 census data, the district of Kew encompasses 64,029 people (not all being registered voters) and 26,076 private dwellings. 50% of residents in the district have attained a bachelor's degree or above, which is 20 points higher than the state average. 43% of residents stated they weren't religious, 21% of residents identified as catholic, 7% of residents identified as Anglican, and 6% of residents identified as Eastern Orthodox. 

96% of residents in the district of Kew that are in the labour force are employed. The median weekly personal income of residents is $991 ($188 higher that the state median), the median weekly household income of residents is $3,010 ($874 higher that the state median).

60% of residents in the district of Kew were born in Australia and 11% of residents were born in China. 24% of residents stated they have Chinese ancestry, 24% of residents stated they have English ancestry, and 20% of residents stated they had Australian ancestry. 62% of residents have had at least one of their parents born overseas.

History 

The seat was created in 1927 and has generally been a safe seat for the Liberal Party and its predecessors. The most notable former member is Dick Hamer, who was Premier of Victoria from 1972 until 1981.  From 1927 to 1981, it was held by only three members, all of whom eventually became Deputy Premiers—Wilfrid Kent Hughes, Arthur Rylah and Hamer.

Members for Kew

Election results

See also 
 1971 Kew state by-election

References

External links
 Electorate profile: Kew District, Victorian Electoral Commission

Electoral districts of Victoria (Australia)
1927 establishments in Australia
City of Boroondara
Electoral districts and divisions of Greater Melbourne